In physics and mathematics, in the area of vector calculus, Helmholtz's theorem, also known as the fundamental theorem of vector calculus, states that any sufficiently smooth, rapidly decaying vector field in three dimensions can be resolved into the sum of an irrotational (curl-free) vector field and a solenoidal (divergence-free) vector field; this is known as the Helmholtz decomposition or Helmholtz representation.  It is named after Hermann von Helmholtz.

Statement of the theorem
Let  be a vector field on a bounded domain , which is twice continuously differentiable inside , and let  be the surface that encloses the domain . Then  can be decomposed into a curl-free component and a divergence-free component:

where

Derivation
Suppose we have a vector function  of which we know the curl, and the divergence, in the domain and the fields on the boundary. Writing the function using delta function in the form

where  is the Laplace operator, we have

where we have used the definition of the vector Laplacian:

Then using the vectorial identities

we get

Thanks to the divergence theorem the equation can be rewritten as

with outward surface normal .

Defining

we finally obtain

Generalization to higher dimensions

where Einstein summation convention is used for the index . For example,  in 2D.

Following the same steps as above, we can write

where  is the Kronecker delta (and the summation convention is again used). In place of the definition of the vector Laplacian used above, we now make use of an identity for the Levi-Civita symbol ,

which is valid in  dimensions, where  is a -component multi-index. This gives

We can therefore write

where

Note that the vector potential is replaced by a rank- tensor in  dimensions.

For a further generalization to manifolds, see the discussion of Hodge decomposition below.

Another derivation from the Fourier transform
We apply the convention

The Fourier transform of a scalar field is a scalar field, and the Fourier transform of a vector field is a vector field of same dimension.

Now consider the following scalar and vector fields:

Hence

Fields with prescribed divergence and curl
The term "Helmholtz theorem" can also refer to the following. Then there exists a vector field  such that

In other words, a vector field can be constructed with both a specified divergence and a specified curl, and if it also vanishes at infinity, it is uniquely specified by its divergence and curl. This theorem is of great importance in electrostatics, since Maxwell's equations for the electric and magnetic fields in the static case are of exactly this type. The proof is by a construction generalizing the one given above: we set

where  represents the Newtonian potential operator.

Solution space

where
  is an harmonic scalar field,
  is any scalar field.

Proof: 
definition of the Helmholtz decomposition,
. 
Taking the divergence of each member of this equation yields 
, hence  is harmonic.

Conversely, given any harmonic function ,
 is solenoidal since

Thus, according to the above section, there exists a vector field  such that
.
If  is another such vector field,
then  
fulfills , hence 
for some scalar field  (and conversely).

Differential forms
The Hodge decomposition is closely related to the Helmholtz decomposition, generalizing from vector fields on R3 to differential forms on a Riemannian manifold M.  Most formulations of the Hodge decomposition require M to be compact. Since this is not true of R3, the Hodge decomposition theorem is not strictly a generalization of the Helmholtz theorem.  However, the compactness restriction in the usual formulation of the Hodge decomposition can be replaced by suitable decay assumptions at infinity on the differential forms involved,  giving a proper generalization of the Helmholtz theorem.

Weak formulation
The Helmholtz decomposition can also be generalized by reducing the regularity assumptions (the need for the existence of strong derivatives). Suppose  is a bounded, simply-connected, Lipschitz domain. Every square-integrable vector field  has an orthogonal decomposition:

For a slightly smoother vector field , a similar decomposition holds:

where .

Longitudinal and transverse fields
A terminology often used in physics refers to the curl-free component of a vector field as the longitudinal component and the divergence-free component as the transverse component. This terminology comes from the following construction: Compute the three-dimensional Fourier transform  of the vector field . Then decompose this field, at each point k, into two components, one of which points longitudinally, i.e. parallel to k, the other of which points in the transverse direction, i.e. perpendicular to k. So far, we have

Now we apply an inverse Fourier transform to each of these components. Using properties of Fourier transforms, we derive:

we can get

so this is indeed the Helmholtz decomposition.

See also
 Clebsch representation for a related decomposition of vector fields
 Darwin Lagrangian for an application
 Poloidal–toroidal decomposition for a further decomposition of the divergence-free component .
 Scalar–vector–tensor decomposition
 Hodge theory generalizing Helmholtz decomposition
 Polar factorization theorem
 Helmholtz–Leray decomposition used for defining the Leray projection

Notes

References

General references

 George B. Arfken and Hans J. Weber, Mathematical Methods for Physicists, 4th edition, Academic Press: San Diego (1995) pp. 92–93
 George B. Arfken and Hans J. Weber, Mathematical Methods for Physicists – International Edition, 6th edition, Academic Press: San Diego (2005) pp. 95–101
 Rutherford Aris, Vectors, tensors, and the basic equations of fluid mechanics, Prentice-Hall (1962), pp. 70–72

References for the weak formulation

 
 R. Dautray and J.-L. Lions.  Spectral Theory and Applications, volume 3 of Mathematical Analysis and Numerical Methods for Science and Technology.  Springer-Verlag, 1990.
 V. Girault and P.A. Raviart.  Finite Element Methods for Navier–Stokes Equations: Theory and Algorithms.  Springer Series in Computational Mathematics.  Springer-Verlag, 1986.

External links
Helmholtz theorem on MathWorld

Vector calculus
Theorems in analysis
Analytic geometry
Hermann von Helmholtz